Sanjay Nishad is an Indian politician serving as a cabinet minister in the Second Yogi Adityanath ministry. He has been a member of Uttar Pradesh Legislative Council since 2021. As a member of the Nishad caste, he founded the NISHAD Party in 2016.

Early life and education 
Sanjay Nishad was born to a Nishad family on 7 June 1965 in Chaumukha, Gorakhpur. He completed a course in electrohomeopathy. He initiated a struggle to get this course recognised as a medical discipline, and founded the Purvanchal Medical Electro Homeopathy Association in 2002 and became its president. Before forming the NISHAD Party, he ran a clinic at Geeta Vatika Road, Gorakhpur for a decade.

Political career 
In 2021, Nishad won the election for the Legislative Council and became a member of Uttar Pradesh Legislative Council. After the victory of NDA in 2022 UP Elections, he became a Cabinet Minister in the Second Yogi Adityanath ministry, and took the oath on 25 March 2022.

Controversy 
On 29 April 2022, Sanjay Nishad gave a controversial statement to the media where he claimed that a person who does not love Hindi is "a foreigner or linked to foreign powers" and that "Hindustan is not a place for those who don’t speak Hindi. They should leave this country and go somewhere else.”

References

1965 births
Living people
Uttar Pradesh Legislative Council
Members of the Uttar Pradesh Legislative Council
State cabinet ministers of Uttar Pradesh
Yogi ministry
People from Gorakhpur
NISHAD Party politicians
Indian politicians